Happy talk is commentary interspersed between news items.

Happy talk may also refer to:

 Happy Talk (horse), a horse ridden by Bruce Davidson
 "Happy Talk" (song), a 1949 popular song from South Pacific, and a UK number one single for Captain Sensible
 Happy Talk, a 2013 novel by Richard Melo
 Happy Talk (album)